The Master of Ávila, a painter in the Flemish style of Fernando Gallego, was active in Ávila and surroundings in the middle of the 15th century. The art historian Elías Tormo and others have tentatively identified him as García del Barco, a painter who was known to have been in Ávila between 1465 and 1473. No works by Barco have been attributed with any certainty.

Works
His artistic "personality" is based on a triptych of the Nativity, originally at the Convent of the Conception; currently at the Lázaro Galdiano Museum.

Other works that have been ascribed to him include the Abrazo ante la Puerta Dorada (Embrace Before the Golden Gate) at the Church of San Vicente de Ávila, a triptych of Saint Dominic and Saint Thomas at the Museum of Vitoria, and altarpieces at the Churches of Saint Martin in Bonilla de la Sierra and Saint Peter at the Cathedral of Ávila. Recently, a "Calvary" at the Museo del Prado, originally assigned to Fernando Gallego, has been re-attributed to him.

García del Barco
García del Barco was known to be active as a painter in Ávila during the 1460s, when he sold a horse to a local clergyman. He appears as a "famous painter" in 1473, when he was hired by Gallego to work on an altarpiece at Coria Cathedral and was delegated to act as one of his arbitrators in the event of any litigation. The other arbitrator named was one Father Pedro de Salamanca, who has also been proposed as a candidate for being the Master.

At an undetermined date, after 1492, he went to Granada, where he died sometime after 1498.

References

Further reading
 Díaz Padrón, Matías, and Torné, Angelina, "La Crucifixión atribuida a Fernando Gallego del Museo del Prado, restituida al Maestro de Ávila", in; Boletín del Museo del Prado, vol. XIX, Madrid, 1996, pp. 75–80.

External links

Biography in the Online Encyclopedia @ the Museo del Prado

Spanish painters
15th-century Spanish painters
Avila
Religious artists